St. Lucie West K-8 is a K-8 school located in Port St. Lucie, Florida. The school mascot is a shark. The district is the St. Lucie County Public Schools. The school was built and founded in 1998. It offers grades Kindergarten to 8th Grade.

References

Elementary schools in Florida
Schools in St. Lucie County, Florida